Matěj Psota  (born January 24, 1994) is a Czech professional ice hockey player. He is currently playing with HC Bílí Tygři Liberec of the Czech Extraliga.

Psota made his Czech Extraliga debut playing with HC Bílí Tygři Liberec during the 2012–13 Czech Extraliga season.

References

External links

1994 births
Living people
Czech ice hockey forwards
HC Bílí Tygři Liberec players
Sportspeople from Liberec
SK Horácká Slavia Třebíč players
HC Benátky nad Jizerou players